All Saints Church is a Parish church of the Scottish Episcopal Church located in the Jordanhill area of Glasgow, Scotland.

History
All Saints' traces its beginnings in 1853, when Jane Charlotte Smith founded a school for miners and other labourers who lived in the Jordanhill area. Jordanhill Mansion, Jane's own home, was initially used for these gatherings, and then moved to a barn where Episcopalian services were held as well. In 1861, Jane founded a chapel school for children, while ecclesiastical services continued to be held by visiting priests. By 1892, a curate was appointed to minister in Jordanhill.

Work on the current church was begun in 1904 when the foundation stone was laid on 26 March 1904. The church was dedicated on 1 November 1904 by Bishop Ean Campbell of Glasgow.

Works of Art
The church was designed by James Chalmers. Chalmers chose a cruciform Neo-Norman style, and added a nave, aisles and transepts. Stugged red ashlar was used to build the church.

The interior is adorned with a number of carved oak reredos, designed by Sir Robert Lorimer. Some were painted by Phoebe Anna Traquair, one of two examples of her work in Glasgow. The church also includes a total of nine stained glass windows. The Triple Oriel east window was installed in 1911 and dedicated to the memory of Jane Charlotte Smith, which depicts Christ in Majesty.

References

External links
 Official website

Episcopal church buildings in Glasgow
Category B listed buildings in Glasgow
Listed churches in Glasgow
1904 establishments in Scotland